May Bukas Pa is a Philippine drama television series produced by Dreamscape Entertainment and directed by Jerome Chavez Pobocan, Jojo A. Saguin, and Erick C. Salud. The series features an ensemble cast consisting of Zaijian Jaranilla, Albert Martinez, Dina Bonnevie, Tonton Gutierrez, Maja Salvador, Rayver Cruz, Dominic Ochoa, Desiree del Valle, Precious Lara Quigaman, Lito Pimentel, and Jaime Fabregas. The series aired on ABS-CBN's Primetime Bida block from February 2, 2009, to February 5, 2010, replacing Eva Fonda and was replaced by Agua Bendita. The series was the highest rated program on Philippine television for both 2009 and 2010 according to Kantar Media Philippines. It is inspired by the 1955 Spanish film, Marcelino pan y vino.

The story revolves around Santino (Zaijian Jaranilla), a wide-eyed young boy orphaned as a baby and was adopted and raised well by Franciscans, whose life was completely different from other kids his age. He might have experienced playing with other children in the fictional town of Barangay Pag-asa, but what made him stand out was his ability to see and converse with Jesus Christ in the flesh, who he fondly called “Bro”, to heal sick people – a power bestowed to him by his Almighty Friend, and to help others with their problems.

The entire series is on YouTube and iWantTFC, while the series' recap is also on YouTube.

Overview
Color key:

Cast and characters

Main cast

Zaijian Jaranilla as Santino Guillermo/Gabriel M. Policarpio/Rodrigo - The show's protagonist, he is a naïve and attentive young boy. Longing for the love of his real mother, he meets with Jesus Christ in the flesh and calls him "Bro". Bro gives him healing powers and assists him as he patches up the lives of the people in their town. He is Enrique and Teresa's biological son.
Albert Martinez as Mayor Enrique D. Rodrigo/Gonzalvo Policarpio and Jairus Aquino as young Enrique Rodrigo/Gonzalvo Policarpio - The mayor of Bagong Pag-asa. He is a stereotypical Filipino politician whose lust for wealth and power will drive him to do illegal acts. He never treated Stella as his real daughter; it is later revealed that Enrique is not her biological father. He is unaware that he is Santino's biological father and develops a sense of compassion for the boy. Later on in the story he learns he is adopted, the son of the couple who was killed when Doña Anita was taking over the land they lived on. He finally married Tilde. He was killed by his younger brother Robert after saving Santino's life and backing out of the mayoralty race, but not before informing Santino of his parentage. He was revealed to be Santino's father in the afterlife scene.
Dina Bonnevie as Malena Rodriguez-Rodrigo/Policarpio - The wife of Enrique. She will do everything to prove her love for her husband. Coming from a wealthy family, Malena envied her sister Selda's intelligence and love for Mario, since she loved him too. This pushed her to commit wrong deeds. Underneath her beauty and glamor is a dark secret that continues to haunt her, she is the only one who knows Santino's biological mother. It was later revealed in a flashback that she accidentally killed Santino's mother. She is initially mistaken to be Santino's mother. She was the only one who can prove that Santino is indeed Enrique's son with Teresa until it was later revealed that Tilde also knows about Malena's hidden secret. She was involved in an accident along with Rico, Malena is forced to get help from Santino causing her to forget her anger against him and accepted him as a friend. Irony takes its place after she and Tilde come face to face at the place where she accidentally killed Teresa. After a fight, Tilde accidentally pushed and killed Malena similarly to the way Malena killed Teresa.
Precious Lara Quigaman as Criselda "Sélda" Rodriguez-Sta. Maria - The wife of Mario, the mother of Joy, and the younger sister of Malena. She's a policewoman. Santino looks up to her as a mother-figure. Along with her sister Malena, she also came from a rich family but she gave up her lifestyle in order to be with her lover Mario and nearly separated from him after learning that Stella is his real daughter.
Tonton Gutierrez as Mario Sta. Maria - A loyal policeman whose terminally-ill daughter Joy was miraculously healed by Santino. He is Sélda's husband, Malena's ex-lover and Stella's real father. He was dismissed from service for alleged insubordination and absence without leave, but resumed with the help of Santino and the townspeople. He nearly separated from Selda. According to several mentions from his superior, his father was also a loyal policeman who was shamefully dismissed for false charges against him, causing him to die as a broken man. Now, he wants to challenge Enrique by running against him in the upcoming mayoral elections.
Maja Salvador as Stella R. Sta. Maria - The obedient daughter of Enrique and Malena. She treats Santino as her younger brother. It is revealed that her biological father is Mario. She was once the girlfriend of Cocoy. She later leaves her parents for their differences, and moves in with Selda and Mario. Stella went to the US but came back with her grandmother. As she returns to Bagong Pag-asa, her anger towards Cocoy still emerged until she found out the truth and came got back with him. Later in the series, she was kidnapped by prostitute dealers after trying to visit her mother at a beach house. She tried to escape but accidentally lit a fire and caused an explosion. As the Bagong Pag-asa police witnessed, they claimed Stella's dead, 'til it was revealed that she did survive the explosion. Stella hasn't spent a lot of time with her mother returned to Bagong Pag-asa, where the household was currently having Malena's funeral.
Rayver Cruz as Francisco "Cocoy" Bautista - An orphaned young man who works as an assistant at the monastery. He was previously detained several times for petty crimes. He was in a relationship with Stella, but they both broke up when Stella asked to do so, and further distanced away when Stella was sent to the US. After explaining everything to her, they got back together, with Cocoy applying for a scholarship in a college to prove his worth to Stella. He is part of the college's basketball varsity team.
Desiree del Valle as Clautilde Katerina "Tilde" Magdayo-Rodrigo/Policarpio - The mayor's mistress and his second wife, she is a former prostitute. She helps to execute the mayor's orders in threatening Santino and the monks. It was later revealed that she was pregnant with Enrique's son. It was revealed that Tilde also knows that Malena killed her friend Teresa; she used this to threaten Malena so that the latter would separate with Enrique, which would ultimately result in Tilde finally having Enrique back in her hands. During a fight with Malena, she accidentally killed her after pushing her off a hill. Months after Malena's death, Enrique married Tilde, in the midst of an ongoing crisis in Bagong Pag-Asa. She was arrested after authorities solved the case of Malena's death, but escaped after pretending to go into labor. She kidnapped and accidentally killed Santino in an attempt to have him heal her colon cancer and save her baby.

Spiritual characters
Love Thadani (uncredited) as Jesus Christ - nicknamed as "Bro", Jesus Christ is Santino's mysterious supernatural friend, who is the supposed source of his healing powers. In scenes where He converses with Santino, His face is hidden and remains so throughout the series. Camera angles used to obscure His face are from behind Him, hair covering the sides of His face (for side shots), a view of His torso part with the head offscreen, Santino from His perspective and other forms. In the "afterlife" scenes in the finale, sunlight obscures His face when cameras are focused on Him and before the end of the afterlife scenes, He is seen in silhouette.
Uncredited voice actor as Satan - Unlike Bro who physically appears, Satan is only depicted as a reddish white light and speaks with a sinister, bone-chilling voice. He pretended to be Jesus and gave Rico psychic powers in order to prophesied misfortunes in Bagong Pag-Asa and he influenced Santino to leave Bagong Pag-asa, allowing Rico to do evil in that town.
Charo Santos-Concio as Mother Mary - A mysterious, kindly looking old woman who appears in the afterlife. Introduced by "Bro" as his Mother.

The Priests

Jaime Fabregas as Fr. Anthony Ruiz - The rigid chief administrator of the monastery. Underneath his strict demeanor is his love and concern for Santino. An assassin sent by Robert killed Father Anthony and Santino tried to resurrect him but was too late. Santino then had a vision of Christ saying that he will rise again and Fr. Anthony woke up after the vision.
Dominic Ochoa as Fr. José dela Cruz - Serving as the chef in the monastery, Santino considers him to be a father-figure. Father Jose formerly worked as a chef (where he later resigned) in a mansion, where Enrique and his brother are hiding their gambling place. Enrique revealed that Fr. José had a wife and a child who were killed in a car accident years back, and he was blamed for their deaths. Later in the series, after being ashamed in breaking the seal of confession to save Santino, he quits the priesthood. However, this gave him an opportunity to legally adopt Santino. 
Lito Pimentel as Fr. Gregorio "Ringo" Samonte and Rodjun Cruz as young Gregorio "Ringo" Samonte - The monastery's bell-ringer which earned him his name. Fr. Ringo lived a life of partying and music prior to his priesthood. His true past was revealed when Enrique was uncovering the dirty secrets of the monastery's priests. Fr. Ringo was an ex-convict for theft, and his calling to religious life came when he served as a sacristan during his prison stint. He was brought to the monastery by Fr. Anthony to start a new life.
Badjie Mortiz as Fr. Paul Makopa - The monastery's gatekeeper. He was also shot by Tatay Ben's men, but was healed by Santino.
David Chua as Fr. Chino "Chi" Wang - The treasurer of the monastery; whose Chinese-Filipino and was supposed to become a businessman, but eventually chose the priesthood. His sister has sought comfort from him after running away from an arranged marriage with a man she did not love.
Andre Tiangco as Fr. George - Father "Linis" (Clean), this obsessive-compulsive priest is always seen with a towel draped on one shoulder, and carrying brooms and mops. He leads the priests in keeping the monastery clean. He is also in charge of the monastery's first aid kit.
Ruben Gonzaga as Fr. Patrick - Takes care of the monastery's little farm and garden. His family engages in fishing; he discovered in a visit to his family that his younger brother, Jepoy, was involved in dynamite fishing.
Edgar Sandalo as Fr. Jude - one of the 12 priests in the monastery, Father Jude is characterized as a grumpy man with a white mustache, beard and hair.
Victor Basa as Fr. John Delgado - the son of a wealthy haciendero and businessman, his father had a lot of dreams for him, but he entered the religious life, estranging him from his father. Later, John and his father reconciled, the latter accepting John's choice.
Fr. Miguel - One of the older Priests that accompanies Fr. Anthony. He gives Santino his share of food whenever Santino gives his food to one of his friends. Saying he wants Santino to eat a proper meal because he loves the boy. 
Fr. Thomas - One of the older Priests that accompanies Fr. Anthony. Fr. Thomas is often seen walking alongside Fr. Miguel and Fr. Jude and he is also seen working at the Garden with Fr. Patrick. In the course of the series, Fr. Thomas is relocated to Sta. Philomena in recommendation to Fr. Anthony on another position at a parish. He stayed until the Music Festival. 
Fr. Chris - One of the younger Priests in the Monastery. Fr. Chris is in charge of the carpentry and crafts being done in the monastery. He checks the doors and windows for repairs in the monastery and at the church. He was also a foreman and volunteered to help in repairing the broken road in front of the Church, and he made all the decorative  Parols outside the church for Santino after he was saved from being kidnapped.

Supporting cast
Ogie Diaz as Renato "Atong" Arguelles - the flamboyantly gay husband of Baby who owns a store business. 
Arlene Muhlach as Viviana "Baby" Arguelles - the "Queen Of Gossips", and Malena's best friend. When Baby discovered that Malena's earrings are the same with Santino's, she suspected Malena as being Santino's mother.
Timothy Chan as Rico R. Rodrigo/Policarpio - Enrique and Malena's son and half-brother to Stella. He started befriending Santino after seeing the boy's good nature. Rico is not privy to the secret of Santino being his paternal half-brother. After Enrique died, Rico was discovered to possess the power of foresight (mostly tragic events, including Santino's death). This must be the series' antagonist and later in the end, he reconciles Santino.
Phoebe Khae Arbotante as Joy R. Sta. Maria - Mario and Selda's daughter, and Stella's half-sister/cousin. When she was terminally ill, she was saved by Santino. As one of Santino's closest friends, she became a member of Santino's Angels.

Additional cast
Francis Magundayao as Paco - one of Santino's closest friends. He used to beg with his grandmother but she got into an accident and was healed by Santino. He promised to God that he will never do those things again. He also became one of the scholars of the monastery and as Santino's friend became a member of Santino's Angels.
Miguelito de Guzman as Alfred - He became friends with Santino after running away from home after his parents are about to get a divorce. He's also a member of Santino's Angels.
Liza Lorena as Doña Anita Rodriguez - Malena and Selda's mother. After living in the US for several years, she returns to the Philippines to pay a visit to the family together with Stella and Robert, her personal assistant. Doña Anita was imprisoned after being formally charged and being proclaimed guilty after being accused for the murder that happened to Bagong Pag-asa 30 years ago. On the day of Malena's burial, she was acquitted on all charges due to lack of evidence.
Michael Conan as Dante Maoricio - a new Police Officer assigned to Bagong Pag-asa.
Ron Morales as Robert Sanchez/ Gustavo Policarpio - Doña Anita's personal assistant who practically takes care of all the files Doña Anita has. He has worked for Doña Anita since she lived in the US, he also took care of Doña Anita's case. It is later revealed that he is the younger brother of Mayor Enrique Rodrigo and also he's a biological uncle of Santino & Rico. He shot Enrique.
Jerry O'Hara as Senior Superintendent Raul Guevarra - the Chief of Police in Bagong Pag-asa.
Rosalie, Kimberly, and Jennifer as fictitious versions of themselves - a trio of idle ladies who are described as gossipers. The additional comic relief of the show, the three always rush into the Arguelles' store to gossip, only to end up being hilariously dismissed by Atong, who accompanies their expulsion with shouts of "Layas!" ("go away" or "get lost"). If they fail to obey Atong's orders, the latter would brandish a kitchen knife to threaten them with death.
Erin Panlilio as Grace - Moy & Jackie's daughter. Grace didn't want to live with her mom because she knows for the fact that Jackie had abandoned them due to her father's lack of money. As part of her wishes, she only wants to be with her father, her grandfather Pilo and their dog, Rocky. Now, she's going to the same school with Santino and his friends (Rico, Joy, Alfred and Paco).

Guest casts

References

May Bukas Pa
May Bukas Pa
May Bukas Pa